Maharashtra Metro Rail Corporation Limited (Maha Metro) is 50:50 Joint Venture company of Government of India & Government of Maharashtra headquartered in Nagpur, India. 

The existing Nagpur Metro Rail Corporation Limited (NMRCL) was reconstituted into Maha Metro for implementation of all Maharashtra state metro projects, except the Mumbai Metropolitan Region.

Project will be covered under the legal framework of the Metro Railways (Construction of Works) Act, 1978; the Metro Railways (Operation and Maintenance) Act, 2002; and the Railways Act, 1989, as amended from time to time.

Operation
 

Maha Metro is responsible for all the metro rail projects undergoing in Maharashtra except the Mumbai Metropolitan Area. It is the implementation authority for Nagpur Metro and Pune Metro projects, except lines that will be handled by the PMRDA.

The upcoming Greater Nasik Metro & Thane Metro will be also implemented and operated by Maha Metro.

Systems

Operational Systems

 MahaMetro Only

Systems in Development

Notes

References

Rapid transit companies of India
Nagpur Metro
Companies based in Nagpur
Government-owned railway companies
Companies with year of establishment missing